Faskally Forest, also known as Faskally Woods, is a wooded area in the historic county of Perthshire, Scotland. It is among the mixed woodlands of Perthshire, and is well known for its radiant colours during the autumn. It is one of the early forest lands of Perthshire Big Tree County. Originally a "model woodland" developed in the 19th century with a resort owned by Archibald Edward Butter. In 1953, Faskally was acquired by the Forestry Commission of Scotland to set up a school for training young foresters.

A colourful annual event at Faskally, known as "The Enchanted Forest", received awards consecutively for three years (2011–2013), as the Best Cultural Event in Scotland.

Location

It is situated on Loch Faskally's north shore, while the forest itself contains Loch Dunmore. The Faskally House is situated within this forest. The River Garry flows below the lawns of this house.

History
The Faskally Forest was created in the 19th century by Archibald Butter, who later built his estate here. The entire estate was acquired by the Forestry Commission, and Faskally House was used as a forestry training centre until the late 1960s when it was shut down. The forest is maintained on a "continuous cover forestry basis" by developing appropriate management plans. Faskally Wood became a part of the Forestry Commission's Tummel Forest administration. Under the East Scotland Conservancy, the priority emphasis for its development was to make it a recreation centre with landscaping of high aesthetics, rather than producing timber.

Features

The soil formation in this forest land is a mixture of brown earth and ironpans that are formed above the Dalradian mica schist. In view of sheltered conditions, the area experiences frost.

The vegetation in the early part of the 20th century consisted of European beech (Fagus sylvatica), Douglas-fir (Pseudotsuga menziesii), European larch (Larix decidua), Norway spruce (Picea abies), and Scots pine (Pinus sylvestris). Following the purchase of the forest land by the Forestry Commission, it was subjected to restrictions and restructuring of the forest vegetation, and reduction of the area. Sequential planting occurred, including Douglas fir, Norway spruce, western hemlock (Tsuga heterophylla), European beech, Scots pine, European larch and silver birch (Betula pendula Roth).

As of 1995, Faskally Woods has 23 species of trees comprising an assemblage of "conifers and broad leaves" vegetation such as Douglas fir, silver firs, wild cherry, and oak. The trees are of various sizes, and some are more than 100 years old.

Events
There is a free, weekly 5K parkrun on Saturdays at 9:30am.

References
Citations

Bibliography

Forests and woodlands of Scotland
Protected areas of Perth and Kinross
Protected areas established in 1953
1953 establishments in Scotland